Rudolf Pälson (24 June 1900 Kudina Parish (now Jõgeva Parish), Kreis Dorpat – 7 December 1924 Tallinn) was an Estonian politician. He was a member of II Riigikogu. On 22 March 1924, he resigned his position and he was replaced by Adolf Zillmer. On 1 December 1924, he participated in the 1924 Estonian coup d'état attempt. On 7 December 1924, he was shot by Estonian police officers in Tallinn while resisting arrest.

References

1900 births
1924 deaths
People from Jõgeva Parish
People from Kreis Dorpat
Workers' United Front politicians
Members of the Riigikogu, 1923–1926
Deaths by firearm in Estonia